The 2017 IAAF World U18 Championships was the tenth and last edition of the biennial international athletics competition for youth (under-18) athletes. The five-day competition took place between 12 and 16 July at the Moi International Sports Centre in Nairobi, Kenya. Eligible athletes were aged 16 or 17 on 31 December 2017 (born in 2000 or 2001).

South Africa topped the medals table with 11 medals, five of them gold, while host nation Kenya finished fourth with four gold and 15 medals in total.

Boycott
The United States, Great Britain, Australia, New Zealand, Canada, Japan, South Korea and Italy decided not to take part in the championships for organizational, logistical, and health and safety reasons (concerning athletes still underage).

Medal summary

Boys

Girls

Mixed 

* Medalists who participated in heats only.

Medal table

Notes
 Independent Athletes were not included in the official medal table.

See also
2017 Asian Youth Championships in Athletics
2017 African Youth Championships in Athletics

References

External links
Official 2017 World U18 Championships website at IAAF
Official website

 
IAAF World Youth Championships in Athletics
World Youth Championships in Athletics
Athletics in Kenya
World Youth Championships in Athletics
International athletics competitions hosted by Kenya
Sport in Nairobi
Athletics